The ATO Congresium is an international convention and exhibition center in Ankara, Turkey. It is a property of the Ankara Trade Chamber (ATO). It opened on 14 September 2012.

On the other floors, are two dividable halls of  area; two lounges of  area; 10 meeting rooms; an auditorium seating 3,107 people; and a  ballroom. It also features dining facilities and two terraces with a view of Ankara.

References

2012 establishments in Turkey
Buildings and structures in Ankara
Convention centers in Turkey
Commercial buildings completed in 2012
Çankaya, Ankara
21st-century architecture in Turkey